The Elephant Song is a Canadian stage play by Nicolas Billon, first presented in 2002 and since performed across Canada and around the world. There is also a film adaptation of the play, released in 2014.

History
The Elephant Song, by Canadian playwright Nicolas Billon, was first presented with a reading at Infinitheatre, Montreal.

The Elephant Song was played on stage in Montreal multiple times, as well as in Stratford and St John's  in Canada, and internationally in Australia, USA, England, Turkey, and Korea.

The UK premiere of The Elephant Song opened at Park Theatre London 2023 produced by OnBook Theatre. director Jason Moore, set and costume designer Ian Nicholas, Lighting and sound Eliott Sheppard. Jon Osbaldeston as Dr Greenberg, Gwithian Evans as Michael and Louise Faulkner as Miss Perterson. Assistant director Luke Mazzamuto

Synopsis
The play is about events following the sudden disappearance of a psychiatrist, Dr. Lawrence, from a mental institution and possible involvement of a young patient of the hospital, Michael, in the disappearance.

Michael is a disturbed son of an opera singer and a distant father he has only seen once. The elephant connection is when in their sole meeting together in a nature reserve, the father kills an elephant in front of his son. The incident traumatizes the very young Michael. So does his mother's cold attitude and her distancing herself from him for a singing career.

Toby Green, an independent psychiatrist is assigned to investigate Michael's involvement as Michael draws the doctor into a psychological mind game involving his past experiences with parents, with Michael claiming he was the cause of his mother's death as he refused to call an ambulance and sang instead the "elephant song" to her until she died on the floor. He discusses the circumstances of his forced stay in the hospital, he hints to doctor-patient improper relationships involving him and his supervising doctor, and a bizarre relationship with the head nurse. Michael's ploys include an attempt to negotiate an early release from hospital, etc. with his plot ending in great tragedy when he finally convinces the investigating doctor to hand him a box of chocolates. Being strongly allergic to them, he dies in the hands of the doctor and the head nurse after having consumed a number of the chocolates he acquired.

Presentations

Canada
2002: Reading at Infinitheatre, Montreal, Canada
2003: Reading at Stratford Festival of Canada, Stratford, Canada
2004: Play at Stratford Festival of Canada, Stratford, Canada
2005: Play at Théâtre d’Aujourd’hui, Montreal, Canada
2007: Play at Infinitheatre, Montreal, Canada
2008: Play at Beothuk Street Players, St-John's, Canada
2010: Play at Théâtre Meka, Montreal, Canada

International
2007: Play at Cairns Little Theatre, Cairns, Australia
2008: Reading at hotINK International Festival, New York City, USA
2008: Reading at Workshop Theater Company, New York City, USA
2009: Reading at Crossing the Divide Festival, London, England
2011: Play at Bakehouse Theatre, Adelaide, Australia
2013–14: Play at Théâtre du Petit Montparnasse, Paris, France
2015: Play at Ali Poyrazoğlu Theatre, Istanbul, Turkey
2015: Play at Suhyeonjae Theatre, Seoul, Korea
2016: Play at DCF DaeMyung Theatre, Seoul, Korea
2017, 2019: Play at Yes24 stage3 (the former Suhyeonjae Theatre), Seoul, Korea
2023: Play at Park Theatre London, UK

Publications
La Chanson de l’Éléphant (French) by Éditions Lémeac (August 2005)
The Elephant Song (English) by Playwrights Canada Press (June 2006)

Film adaptation

The play was adapted into a drama film directed by Charles Binamé and released in 2014. with Bruce Greenwood as Toby Green, Xavier Dolan as Michael. The film premiered at the 2014 Toronto International Film Festival.

References

External links
Nicolas Billon official website / The Elephant Song page

Elephant
2002 plays